Joshua David Wilcox (born June 5, 1974) is a former American football tight end who played two seasons with the New Orleans Saints of the National Football League (NFL). He played college football at the University of Oregon and attended Junction High School in Junction City, Oregon. Wilcox was also a member of the Portland Forest Dragons of the Arena Football League, the Amsterdam Admirals of NFL Europe and the Los Angeles Xtreme of the XFL. He won the Million Dollar Game in the XFL as a member of the Los Angeles Xtreme. Wilcox is the son of Pro Football Hall of Famer Dave Wilcox and brother of California football coach Justin Wilcox. He also spent time as a professional wrestler.

References

External links
Just Sports Stats
College stats
Fanbase profile
realjoshwilcox.com

Living people
1974 births
Players of American football from Oregon
American football tight ends
Oregon Ducks football players
New Orleans Saints players
Portland Forest Dragons players
Amsterdam Admirals players
Los Angeles Xtreme players
Sportspeople from Eugene, Oregon
People from Junction City, Oregon
Professional wrestlers from Oregon
American male professional wrestlers